Dalmatia is a historical region by the Adriatic in Croatia.

Dalmatia may also refer to:

 any of the historical Dalmatian political entities:
 Dalmatia (Roman province) (32 BC–c. 482 AD)
 Dalmatia (theme) (c. 870–1060s)
 Venetian Dalmatia (1409–1797)
 Kingdom of Dalmatia (1815–1918)
 Governorate of Dalmatia (1941–1943)
 MS Dalmatia, a cruiseferry owned by the Croatia-based operator Blue Line
 Dalmatia, Pennsylvania, a census-designated place in Northumberland County, Pennsylvania, United States
 Dalmatia Creek, a tributary of the Susquehanna in Pennsylvania, United States

See also
 Dalmatian (disambiguation)